<div style="float: right; font-size: smaller; background-color:#E6E6FA; padding: 12px; margin-left: 5em; margin-bottom: 2em; width: 180px" align="center">

1st Online Film Critics Society Awards
January 11, 1998

Best Picture:
<big>L.A. Confidential</big>
</div>
The 1st Online Film Critics Society Awards''', honoring the best in film for 1997, were given on 11 January 1998.

Winners and nominees

References 

1997
1997 film awards